is a Japanese footballer who plays for Zweigen Kanazawa.

Career
Naoki Harada joined the J3 League club; Zweigen Kanazawa in 2014. In 2016, he debuted in the Emperor's Cup.

Club statistics
Updated to 23 February 2018. On 9 January 2019, Hatada joined Vonds Ichihara.

References

External links

Profile at Zweigen Kanazawa

1991 births
Living people
Hannan University alumni
Association football people from Hiroshima Prefecture
Japanese footballers
J2 League players
J3 League players
Zweigen Kanazawa players
Association football goalkeepers